Directflight Limited, trading as Airtask Group, is a British airline based in Cranfield, Bedfordshire, England and operating flights mainly in the Shetland Islands. It is a subsidiary of Airtask Group Ltd. Directflight (Scotland) Limited was dissolved on 12 July 2013 and merged into Directflight Limited.

Destinations

Scotland 

Shetland Island Inter Island Air Services:

Fleet

As of July 2017 the Shetland Island Inter Island Air Services fleet consists of the following aircraft:

As of July 2017 the Directflight fleet consists of the following aircraft:

External links
 Airtask - Shetland Islands Inter-Island service

References

Airlines of the United Kingdom
Aviation in Shetland